Lake Ellsworth or Ellsworth Lake may refer to:

 Lake Ellsworth (Antarctica), a subglacial lake
 Lake Ellsworth (Oklahoma), a reservoir in Oklahoma
 Ellsworth Lake (Michigan), part of the Elk River Chain of Lakes Watershed